This article concerns the Serbian political party called the Liberal Democratic Party (Liberalno Demokratska Stranka). A different party is called the Liberal Democratic Party (Liberalno Demokratska Partija), led by Čedomir Jovanović.

Liberal-Democratic Party (transliteration into the Latin alphabet: Liberalno Demokratska Stranka'') is a liberal party in Serbia, founded on December 14, 1989. It claims heritage of the Liberal Party, founded in 1858.

External links
Former official site

Liberal parties in Serbia
Political parties established in 1989
Defunct political parties in Serbia